Laurie King may refer to:

 Laurie R. King (born 1952), American author
 Laurie King (footballer) (1908–1992), Australian rules footballer